Maithon Power Limited (MPL) is a joint venture of Tata Power & Damodar Valley Corporation, which has implemented the 1050 MW (2X525 MW units) in Nirsa District Dhanbad in the state of Jharkhand in India. This project is India’s first 525 MW unit thermal power plants using subcritical technology, coal-based thermal power plant in the country and the first PPP venture plant in the country. This project is India's first Public Private power project. 

As per the bidding norms, the Project was designed to be run on Indian coal. The Project is expected to benefit close to 16 million domestic consumers apart from supplying cost competitive power to industry and agriculture.

The Project will supply power to four states namely New Delhi, Jharkhand, West Bengal and Kerala as per long term PPA which are currently facing shortage of electricity. It will provide a competitive source of power and help meet these states’ growing demand for electricity. Reliable power from the project will help improve the competitiveness of the manufacturing and services industries.

Capacity
It has an installed capacity of 1050 MW.

References

External links

 Maithon Right Bank Thermal Power Station at SourceWatch

Coal-fired power stations in Jharkhand
Dhanbad district
Tata Power
Energy infrastructure completed in 2011
2011 establishments in Jharkhand